The Society for Philosophy and Technology (SPT) is an independent international organization founded in 1976 whose purpose is to promote philosophical consideration of technology. SPT publishes Techné: Research in Philosophy and Technology, a tri-annual scientific journal.

History 
 1975: Newsletter launched: formation of SPT and establishing the journal Techné in years to follow
 1978: Annual Book Series Research in Philosophy of Technology was launched
 1981: Actual organization of SPT with the first biennial international meeting organized by Fritz Rapp in Bad Homberg, Germany
 1995: The first issue of Techné
 2010: Techné is published by the Philosophy Documentation Center

Presidents 
A new president for the Society for Philosophy and Technology is chosen every two years (except in 1995).
 1981: Carl Mitcham
 1983: Alex Michalos
 1985: Kristin Shrader-Frechette
 1987: Marx Wartofsky
 1989: Langdon Winner
 1991: Joseph C. Pitt
 1993: Jose Sanmartin
 1997: Paul Durbin
 1999: Deborah Johnson
 2001: Andrew Light
 2003: Paul Thompson
 2005: Peter Kroes
 2007: Diane Michelfelder
 2009: Philip Brey
 2011: Sven Ove Hansson
 2013: Peter-Paul Verbeek
 2015: Shannon Vallor
 2017: Mark Coeckelbergh
 2019: Pieter E. Vermaas
 2021: Inmaculada de Melo-Martín
 2023: President-Elect Robert Rosenberger

SPT conferences 

 1981: Bad Homberg, Germany: Joint German-American Conference (Rapp), Germany, Organizer: Fritz Rapp
 1983: Polytechnic Institute of New York, NYC, USA, Organizer: Carl Mitcham
 1985: University of Twente, Netherlands, Organizer: Louk Fleishacker of Free University, Amsterdam
 1987: Virginia Tech, Blacksburg, VA, Organizer: Joe Pitt
 1989: Bordeaux, France, Organizer: Daniel Cerezuelle
 1991: University of Puerto Rico, Mayaguez, Puerto Rico, Organizer: Elena Lugo
 1993: Peniscola (Valencia), Spain, Organizer: Jose Sanmartin
 1995: Hofstra University, Long Island, New York, USA
 1996: Puebla, Mexico, Organizer: Raul Gutierrez
 1997: University of Düsseldorf, Germany, Organizer: Alois Huning
 1999: University of California, San Jose / Silicon Valley, USA, Organizer: Noam Cook
 2001: Aberdeen, Scotland, Organizer: Andrew Light
 2003: Park City, Utah, USA, Organizer: Diane Michelfelder
 2005: Delft University of Technology, Delft, The Netherlands, Organizer: Peter Kroes
 2007: USC/VT, Charleston, South Carolina, USA, Organizers: Davis Baird, Ann Johnson, Joe Pitt
 2009: University of Twente, Enschede, The Netherlands, Organizers: Philip Brey, Tsjalling Swierstra, Peter-Paul Verbeek, Katinka Waelbers
 2011: University of North Texas, Denton, Texas, USA, Organizers: David Kaplan and Adam Briggle
 2013: in Lisbon, Portugal
 2015: NEU International Hotel, Shenyang, China
 2017: Technische Universität Darmstadt, Germany, Organizers: Alfred Nordmann and Sabine Ammon
 2019: Texas A&M University, College Station, Texas, USA, Organizers: Martin Peterson (Chair), Deb Banerjee, Jonathan Coopersmith, Glen Miller, Gregory Pappas, Linda Radzik 
 2021 (Planned): Lille, France

Pre-SPT events 

 1965: symposium at 8th annual SHOT (with AAAS) meeting in San Francisco
 1973: international conference on history and philosophy of technology, University of Illinois
 1975: University of Delaware (Paul T. Durbin): first meeting of philosophers interested in technology, organized with much help from Carl Mitcham
 1977: 2d UD meeting, at which they talked about a society and established a newsletter (with Durbin as first editor), as well as set in motion meetings jointly with APA sections, and an election some time before the end of 1980. (First candidates were Carl Mitcham, who won, and Mario Bunge.)
 1978: First APA Eastern meeting. Also first volume in RESEARCH IN PHILOSOPHY AND TECHNOLOGY (Johnson) series.

References

External links 
SPT website
 Techné: Research in Philosophy and Technology

Philosophy of technology
International learned societies
Philosophical societies